Kia River Awyu, or Jair (Djair), is a Papuan language of Papua, Indonesia, spoken along the Kia River. It is closely related to Edera River Awyu. Upper Kia River Awyu and Lower Kia River Awyu may be distinct languages, depending on one's criteria.

References

Languages of western New Guinea
Awyu–Dumut languages